Emilio Gattoronchieri (born February 7, 1912 in Milan) was an Italian professional football player.

Honours
 Serie A champion: 1937/38.

1912 births
Year of death missing
Italian footballers
Serie A players
A.C. Milan players
Inter Milan players
Venezia F.C. players
U.C. Sampdoria players
Aurora Pro Patria 1919 players
Association football midfielders